

Medalists

Qualification

Qualification rule: qualification standard 5.70m or at least best 8 qualified

Final

Pole vault at the World Athletics Indoor Championships
Pole Vault Men